Pirisudanol (Mentis, Menthen, Mentium, Nadex, Nadexen, Nadexon, Pridana, Stivane), also known as pyrisuccideanol, is the succinic acid ester of pyridoxine (a form of vitamin B6) and of deanol (DMAE). It has been used in Europe in the treatment of mild cognitive impairment as well as fatigue and depression.

See also 
 Pyritinol

References 

Cholinergics
Pyridines
Phenols
Primary alcohols
Succinate esters
Prodrugs
Nootropics
Antidepressants